Marie Bochet (born 2 February 1994) is a French alpine skier and Paralympic Champion.

Life
Bochet was born in Chambéry in 1994. She was five when she started skiing.  She has a disability and she was the first skier to finish in the Giant Slalom race. She skied at the 2011 IPC Alpine Skiing World Championships and she was the second skier to finish in the standing women's downhill race and the Super G.

Bochet competed in the 2014 Winter Paralympics in Sochi, Russia, where she won four gold medals.

At the 2018 Winter Paralympics in PyeongChang, Bochet won four further gold medals.

At the PyeongChang Games, she was elected a member of the International Paralympic Committee and joined the athlete's commission. She is also a member of the athlete's commission for the 2024 Olympic and Paralympic Games.

References

External links 
 
 

1994 births
Living people
Alpine skiers at the 2014 Winter Paralympics
Alpine skiers at the 2018 Winter Paralympics
Alpine skiers at the 2022 Winter Paralympics
French female alpine skiers
Medalists at the 2014 Winter Paralympics
Medalists at the 2018 Winter Paralympics
Medalists at the 2022 Winter Paralympics
Paralympic alpine skiers of France
Paralympic gold medalists for France
Paralympic silver medalists for France
International Paralympic Committee members
Sportspeople from Chambéry
Paralympic medalists in alpine skiing
20th-century French women
21st-century French women